Augusto Gabriel Andolong de Leon (born September 28, 1992) known professionally as Gabriel de Leon is a Filipino actor who appeared in Teen Gen. He is the son of Christopher de Leon and Sandy Andolong

Personal life 
de Leon was born on September 28, 1992, to actor Christopher de Leon and actress Sandy Andolong. He comes from a family of actors. He is the grandson of Lilia Dizon and Gil de León, the younger brother of beauty queen Mariel de Leon. and the younger half-brother of Lotlot, Ian, Matet, Kiko and Kenneth de Leon from His father's former marriage to Nora Aunor. de Leon resembled his father as a teenager.

Television series

References

External links
 

Living people
Filipino male television actors
Filipino people of Spanish descent
Filipino people of German descent
1992 births
Gabriel